KPGM (1500 AM) is a radio station broadcasting a sports format. Currently, KPGM is a WWLS The Sports Animal and Fox Sports Radio affiliate. The station is licensed to Pawhuska, Oklahoma, United States, and is currently owned by Potter Radio, LLC.  In addition to being heard at 1500 AM and Bartlesvilleradio.com, KPGM simulcasts on KYFM 100.1's HD2 channel and on a translator at 99.1 MHz in Bartlesville.

The FCC first licensed this station to begin operations on April 6, 1964 using callsign KOSO.

Translators

References

External links

PGM
Osage County, Oklahoma
Fox Sports Radio stations
PGM
Radio stations established in 1964
1964 establishments in Oklahoma